Non-Muslim Provinces under Early Islam: Islamic Rule and Iranian Legitimacy in Armenia and Caucasian Albania is a book by Alison Vacca about medieval Armenia and Caucasian Albania. The book deals with the change from Sasanian rule to caliphal rule within these two predominantly Christian polities who were part of the Iranian cultural sphere. The book focusses on the history of Armenia and Caucasian Albania under the Islamic Caliphate, elements of administrative continuity between Sasanian and caliphal rule, and changes in administration by the Marwanids and early Abbasids in relation to these two provinces. Additionally, according to the book description: "Vacca examines historical narrative and the construction of a Sasanian cultural memory during the late ninth and tenth centuries to place the provinces into a broader context of Iranian rule". The book is considered to be within the scope of Islamic, Iranian and Caucasus studies, in addition to being of interest for those studying Iranian identity and Muslim-Christian relations within Western Asia.

References

Further reading
 2018 review by Hannah-Lena Hagemann in Bulletin of the School of Oriental and African Studies
 2020 review by Hugh N. Kennedy in Journal of Islamic Studies
 2020 review by Sergio La Porta in Medieval Encounters

2017 non-fiction books
Medieval Armenia
Caucasian Albania
Caliphates
Sasanian Empire
Medieval Azerbaijan
Cambridge University Press books
History books about Iran
History books about Armenia
History books about Islam
Caucasology